Chump Change is a 2000 comedy film, written and directed by and starring Stephen Burrows. The film is based on Burrows' experiences as a screen writer.

Cast
 Stephen Burrows as Steve "Milwaukee Steve"
 Tim Matheson as Simon "Sez" Simone
 Traci Lords as Sam
 Jerry Stiller as The Colonel
 Anne Meara as Casting Director
 Abe Vigoda as "The Frog"
 Clancy Brown as The Man
 Mary Scheer as Agent #2

External links
 
 
 
 

2000 films
Films set in Wisconsin
2000 romantic comedy films
American romantic comedy films
2000s English-language films
2000s American films